Elections to Kilmarnock and Loudoun District Council were held on 7 May 1974, on the same day as the other Scottish local government elections. This was the first election to the district council following the implementation of the Local Government (Scotland) Act 1973.

The election used the 16 wards created by the Formation Electoral Arrangements in 1974. Each ward elected one councillor using first-past-the-post voting.

Labour took control of the council after winning a large majority. The party took 12 of the 16 seats and more than 50% of the popular vote. The other four seats were won by the Conservatives.

Background
The area that was to become Kilmarnock and Loudoun, included five of the 17 burghs within the County of Ayr. The four small burghs (Darvel, Galston, Newmilns and Greenholm and Stewarton) had limited powers which included some control over planning as well as local taxation, building control, housing, lighting and drainage. The large burgh of Kilmarnock had further powers over the police, public health, social services, registration of births, marriages and deaths and electoral registration. The rest of the local government responsibility fell to the county council which had full control over the areas which were not within a burgh.

Following the recommendations in the Wheatly Report, the old system of counties and burghs – which had resulted in a mishmash of local government areas in which some small burghs had larger populations but far fewer responsibilities than some large burghs and even counties – was to be replaced by a new system of regional and district councils.

Results

Source:

Ward results

Ward 1

Ward 2

Ward 3

Ward 4

Ward 5

Ward 6

Ward 7

Ward 8

Ward 9

Ward 10

Ward 11

Ward 12

Ward 13

Ward 14

Ward 15

Ward 16

References

1974 Scottish local elections
1974